Ezmareh-ye Sofla (also Romanized as Ez̧māreh-ye Soflá; also known as ‘Abdollāh Kandī and Ez̧māreh-ye Pā’īn) is a village in Ani Rural District, in the Central District of Germi County, Ardabil Province, Iran. At the 2006 census, its population was 46, in 11 families.

References 

Towns and villages in Germi County